Sutton Parkway railway station serves the town of Sutton-in-Ashfield in Nottinghamshire, England.

Services
All services at Sutton Parkway are operated by East Midlands Railway.

On Sundays, the station is served by a two-hourly service between Nottingham and Mansfield Woodhouse, with no service to Worksop. Sunday services to Worksop are due to recommence at the station during the life of the East Midlands franchise.

Facilities

Access to the platforms is at street level with car parks located on both sides of the platforms given excellent access for the disabled.

There are no toilet facilities on this station.

Local transport connections

There is only an hourly bus service operating outside the station by Trent Barton to the local area. There are buses between Kirkby-in-Ashfield railway station and Sutton-in-Ashfield itself.

There is no taxi rank at the station.

References

External links

Railway stations in Nottinghamshire
DfT Category F1 stations
Railway stations opened by Railtrack
Railway stations in Great Britain opened in 1995
Railway stations served by East Midlands Railway
Sutton-in-Ashfield